Jeron E. Harvey (born June 25, 1984) is an arena football wide receiver who is a free agent. He was signed by the Jacksonville Jaguars as an undrafted free agent in 2008. He played college football at Houston.

Harvey has also been a member of the Arkansas Twisters, Toronto Argonauts and Jacksonville Sharks.

Early years
He graduated from Andrew Jackson High School in Jacksonville, Florida, where his high school teammates included New York Jets running back Leon Washington, Ole Miss wide receiver Michael Hicks and Bethune-Cookman All-American Vernon Edwards.

College career
He was not recruited by Division I teams when he graduated high school; instead, he attended Dodge City Community College in Dodge City, Kansas before transferred to the University of Houston, where he played with Kevin Kolb and Donnie Avery. At Dodge City, he recorded 52 receptions and 14 touchdowns in one year.

Professional career

Jacksonville Jaguars
He signed as an undrafted rookie free agent with his hometown team, the Jacksonville Jaguars on April 27, 2008. Several of his teammates were also Jacksonville natives:  Rashean Mathis attended Englewood High School and Jamaal Fudge went to Ed White High School. Harvey was released by Jacksonville on August 26, 2008.

Toronto Argonauts
Harvey was signed by the Toronto Argonauts on March 9, 2009. He was released on April 15, 2009.

Jacksonville Sharks
Harvey signed with the Jacksonville Sharks on January 2, 2010. On August 12, 2011, he caught the game-winning touchdown pass from Aaron Garcia for the Sharks as time expired in ArenaBowl XXIV.

Monterrey Steel
Harvey signed with the Monterrey Steel on June 21, 2017.

References

External links
Jacksonville Jaguars bio
Toronto Argonauts bio

1984 births
Living people
Andrew Jackson High School (Jacksonville) alumni
Players of American football from Jacksonville, Florida
American football wide receivers
Canadian football wide receivers
Houston Cougars football players
Jacksonville Jaguars players
Arkansas Twisters players
Toronto Argonauts players
Jacksonville Sharks players
Florida Tarpons players
Monterrey Steel players
Dodge City Conquistadors football players